Zulu is the surname of:

 Alexander Grey Zulu (born 1924), Zambian retired politician
 Alphaeus Zulu (1905–1987), Anglican bishop and Speaker of the KwaZulu Legislative Assembly
 Ballad Zulu, Zambian singer, multi-instrumentalist, songwriter and economist
 Justin Zulu (born 1989), Zambian footballer
 Mahenge Zulu (1965–2019), Italian boxer
 Maiko Zulu, Zambian musician
 Onthatile Zulu (born  2000), South Africa field hockey player
 Winstone Zulu (1964–2011), Zambian HIV and tuberculosis activist

Bantu-language surnames
Zambian surnames
Surnames of South African origin